Mendonk is a village in the Belgian Province of East Flanders, a part of the urban area of the province's capital city Ghent.

It is situated near the canal that connects the cities of Ghent and Terneuzen, which puts Mendonk in the middle of an industrial area. Its population is 243 (2007).

Sub-municipalities of Ghent
Populated places in East Flanders